Since 1971, the Nevada Gaming Control Board (NGCB) publishes an annual Abstract summarizing gaming and non-gaming revenue for the entire state. The document is roughly 250 pages long. Detailed data is provided for different groups of casinos, organized by geography, size (according to gaming revenue), and public corporations vs. privately owned. Nevada State Gaming law NRS 463.120. requires that financial information for individual casinos be kept in confidence.

The names of the resorts in any category are often speculated on but a definitive list is not revealed by the NGCB in accordance with state law. A category is known as casinos with gaming revenue above $72 million per year has been in use for over 20 years. However, independent analysis conducted by Frank Martin has revealed the names of the resorts for the Fiscal Year 2008.

By the end of the decade, Nevada had become the fastest-growing state in the nation and increased gaming revenues by 150 percent.

Gaming Revenue Depression
Monthly revenue from October 2007 represents the highest yearly moving average (i.e. 12 months ending October 2007). The 12 months moving average ending October 2009 is the same as the 12 months ending October 2004 (so gaming is now down to what it was five years ago). The pit revenue for the state is shown in the graph. Slot revenue also dropped a billion and a half dollars since October 2007. Blackjack gaming revenue is down to the 1997 levels.

Large Revenue Casino Resorts
One statewide category is Statewide Casinos with Room Facilities with Gaming Revenue of over $72 million a year. The document indicates that there are 45 locations that qualify for this category in the fiscal year 2009 (1 July 2008 - 30 June 2009). Five of the locations are Not Publicly Owned which means they also have no public debt. There are 23 properties located on the strip, 13 more in urban Las Vegas, 3 in Laughlin, and the final 6 in Lake Tahoe and Reno area.

The aggregate of the 45 casinos earned about 71% of the gaming revenue for the state, and over 70% of the non-gaming revenue. These properties averaged $190 million in gaming revenue and $227 million in non-gaming revenue.

Top 6 Revenue Casino Resorts
The NGCB abstract gives the total revenue (gaming and non-gaming) for the strip resort ranked #6, but it does not give the names of the top casinos. It can be presumed that they are the following resorts in the table below

Number of Properties in Other Revenue Groups
The names of the individual properties in lower revenue groups is more of interest to a potential investor as a top level analysis of the property revenue.

Smaller Publicly Owned Casinos
This table is restricted to casinos that earn more than $12 million in gaming revenue in FY08. The previous table for gaming revenue greater than $72 million lists 47 casinos (42 of which are publicly owned). The additional list is 36 casinos (for a total of 78 publicly-owned casinos in the state). Properties may or may not have rooms. Status is as of June 30, 2008.

The highest-profile resort on the strip area that did not exceed $72 million is the Hard Rock Casino. The company only secured its loan for expansion in June 2008 and began construction shortly thereafter. The trio of classic casinos on the strip from the 1950s, The Tropicana,The Riviera, and The Sahara earned less than $72 million in FY08. Since the list is re-evaluated from year to year, these casinos may have made it in the past. Local Casinos in the Las Vegas area like the Silverton Casino, the Fiesta Henderson, Fiesta Rancho did not surpass $72 million.

Herbst Gaming owns a chain of 8 properties branded as Terribles. None of these properties are in the over $72 million category, but three are in the above list of $12 to $72 million properties. By elimination, there are five TERRIBLE'S properties that are in the $1 to $12 million category. In addition there are 4 other company-owned properties in the $12 to $72 million category that does not have the TERRIBLE'S brand name.

The Herbst corporation reports in their annual report that the combined NV casino operations generated $337 million, but does not segment the number by property, gaming, room charge, RV charges,  food and beverage, or other.

Gaming Revenue Graph
Monthly revenue from October 2007 represent the monthly peak. It also is the highest yearly moving average (i.e. 12 months ending October 2007). The 12 month moving average ending October 2009 is the same as the 12 months ending October 2004 (so gaming is now down to what it was five years ago).

All casinos in state with Gaming Revenue Over $1m
Total casino count by county  and county population on 1 July 2008 is in the table below. The NGCB is prohibited by state law from revealing financial information on individual casinos, so it reports detailed financial data on groups of casinos.

The NGCB divides the 8 casinos in Douglas County as 5 in the South Lake Tahoe region, while the remaining 3 casinos are grouped along with the 11 casinos in Carson City in a region called Carson Valley. Douglas County has a major mountain ridge passing through the county that can be traversed via route 207, passing higher than 8500'.

The 42 casinos in largely rural counties are grouped together for statistical purposes by the NGCB as the balance of counties.

A full list of all the licenses that earned more than $1m in fiscal year 2009 is available by reference.

Clark county contains Las Vegas, Washoe county contains Reno/Sparks area, Elko county is the main gateway to Utah, South Lake Tahoe is a principal tourist area, and Carson Valley contains the state capital.

Previous Years
The number of properties with revenue over $72 million has increased over the years (particularly outside of the strip). However, most of the large gains have been a result of mega resorts being built on the strip. The NGCB has not created a new category for the very large resorts (example: over $144 million). This hypothetical new category would probably contain at least ten resorts on the strip.

In 1990 the population of Clark County was 3/4 million (vs. 2 million today). The only locals casino likely to have broken $72 million in 1990 was Sam's Town (Palace Station is considered to be a strip casino by the NGCB). There are currently 8 casinos in northern Nevada and Laughlin that are currently over $72 million. In 1990 seven of them existed. The financial information controlled by the NGCB is confidential forever, and is not released even after 7 years.

The table shows Gaming Licenses that earned over $72m per year for Las Vegas Strip and for State of Nevada. Also the number of licenses which earned gaming revenue of over $1m per annum for the entire state are shown.

Properties connected by hallways are permitted to operate under one license at the discretion of the owner. For most of FY2008 Ballys and Paris operated under one license; Venetian/Palazzo, Wynn/Encore, and Mandalay Bay/THE Hotel operate under one gaming license.

See also
Problem gambling

References

Economy of Nevada